Delta North is a provincial electoral district for the Legislative Assembly of British Columbia, Canada.

History 
The electoral district was created for the 1991 election from part of the dual-member Delta riding.

Members of the Legislative Assembly

Election results 

|-

|- bgcolor="white"
!align="right" colspan=3|Total Valid Votes
!align="right"|20,565
!align="right"|100%
!align="right"|
|- bgcolor="white"
!align="right" colspan=3|Total Rejected Ballots
!align="right"|88
!align="right"|0.43%
!align="right"|
|- bgcolor="white"
!align="right" colspan=3|Turnout
!align="right"|20,653
!align="right"|59.26%
!align="right"|
|}

|-
 
|NDP
|Guy Gentner
|align="right"|10,481
|align="right"|47.46%
|align="right"|
|align="right"|$52,677

|-

|- bgcolor="white"
!align="right" colspan=3|Total Valid Votes
!align="right"|22,083
!align="right"|100%
!align="right"|
|- bgcolor="white"
!align="right" colspan=3|Total Rejected Ballots
!align="right"|124
!align="right"|0.56%
!align="right"|
|- bgcolor="white"
!align="right" colspan=3|Turnout
!align="right"|22,207
!align="right"|64.24%
!align="right"|
|}

|-

|-
 
|NDP
|Norm Lortie
|align="right"|3,734
|align="right"|18.97%
|align="right"|
|align="right"|$3,744

|- bgcolor="white"
!align="right" colspan=3|Total Valid Votes
!align="right"|19,687
!align="right"|100.00%
!align="right"|
|- bgcolor="white"
!align="right" colspan=3|Total Rejected Ballots
!align="right"|84
!align="right"|0.43%
!align="right"|
|- bgcolor="white"
!align="right" colspan=3|Turnout
!align="right"|19,771
!align="right"|72.65%
!align="right"|
|}

|-

|-
 
|NDP
|Norm Lortie
|align="right"|8,657
|align="right"|42.33%
|align="right"|
|align="right"|$24,416

|- bgcolor="white"
!align="right" colspan=3|Total Valid Votes
!align="right"|20,449
!align="right"|100.00%
!align="right"|
|- bgcolor="white"
!align="right" colspan=3|Total Rejected Ballots
!align="right"|120
!align="right"|0.58%
!align="right"|
|- bgcolor="white"
!align="right" colspan=3|Turnout
!align="right"|20,569
!align="right"|74.88%
!align="right"|
|}

|-
 
|NDP
|Norm Lortie
|align="right"|8,068
|align="right"|38.65%
|align="right"|
|align="right"|$29,903
|-

|Independent
|Benjamin B. Wolfe
|align="right"|72
|align="right"|0.34%
|align="right"|
|align="right"|$57

|- bgcolor="white"
!align="right" colspan=3|Total Valid Votes
!align="right"|20,876
!align="right"|100.00%
!align="right"|
|- bgcolor="white"
!align="right" colspan=3|Total Rejected Ballots
!align="right"|387
!align="right"|1.82%
!align="right"|
|- bgcolor="white"
!align="right" colspan=3|Turnout
!align="right"|21,263
!align="right"|78.60%
!align="right"|
|}

References

External links 
BC Stats Profile - 2001
Results of 2001 election
Results of 1996 election
Results of 1991 election
Website of the Legislative Assembly of British Columbia

British Columbia provincial electoral districts
Politics of Delta, British Columbia
Provincial electoral districts in Greater Vancouver and the Fraser Valley